Marie-Madeleine Dienesch (1914–1998) was a French politician who served as a member of the National Assembly of France and a Member of the European Parliament over a period of 35 years. She was the second woman to be a French minister.

Life
Born in Cairo, Egypt, Dienesch moved to France at a young age, and attended a girls' college in Neuilly-sur-Seine before graduating from the University of Paris. She was a teacher during World War II, and after the war ended she began to get involved in politics. 

Dienesch was elected to the French Fourth Republic parliament out of Côtes-d'Armor's 3rd constituency in November 1945, and she served in that position through 1981. She supported the Presidency of Charles de Gaulle en route to the founding of the Fifth French Republic in 1958, and as one of the few women actively in politics through the Fourth Republic, she became a regional leader for the Popular Republican Movement.

In 1968, she became the second female government minister in France after Nafissa Sid Cara when she was named State Secretary for National Education, a position that allowed her to sit in on cabinet meetings. She served in that position for three months, then served as Secretary of State for Social Assistance and Rehabilitation from 1968 to 1974. From 1975 to 1978, Dienesch was named the French Ambassador to Luxembourg, and in 1979 she was elected to the European Parliament, and served as a member of the European Progressive Democrats group. She resigned from the position a year later, and retired from politics altogether in 1981.

References

1914 births
1998 deaths
Union for a Popular Movement politicians
MEPs for France 1979–1984
20th-century women MEPs for France
Rally for the Republic MEPs
Deputies of the 1st National Assembly of the French Fifth Republic
Deputies of the 2nd National Assembly of the French Fifth Republic
Deputies of the 3rd National Assembly of the French Fifth Republic
Deputies of the 4th National Assembly of the French Fifth Republic
Deputies of the 5th National Assembly of the French Fifth Republic
Deputies of the 6th National Assembly of the French Fifth Republic
Egyptian emigrants to France
Ambassadors of France